The Pearl Meister Greengard Prize is an award for women scientists in biology given annually by the Rockefeller University.

The Prize was founded by Nobel laureate Paul Greengard and his wife Ursula von Rydingsvard in honor of Greengard's mother, Pearl Meister Greengard, who died giving birth to him. Greengard began funding the award in 1998. Greengard donated the full share of his 2000 Nobel Prize to the fund, and was able to use his new publicity to attract additional funding for the award, which was launched in 2004. The award is meant to shine a spotlight on exceptional female scientists, since, as Greengard observed, "[women] are not yet receiving awards and honors at a level commensurate with their achievements."

The award includes a $100,000 honorarium (previously $50,000).

Two recipients of the Prize, Carol Greider and Elizabeth Blackburn, have gone on to receive the Nobel Prize in Physiology or Medicine. One recipient, Jennifer Doudna, received the Nobel Prize in Chemistry.

Winners

Source: Rockefeller University
 Nicole Marthe Le Douarin (2004)
 Philippa Marrack (2005)
 Mary Frances Lyon (2006)
 Gail R. Martin, Beatrice Mintz, Elizabeth Robertson (2007)
 Elizabeth Blackburn, Carol Greider, Vicki Lundblad (2008)
 Suzanne Cory (2009)
 Janet Rowley and Mary-Claire King (2010)
 Brenda Milner (2011)
 Joan Steitz (2012)
 Huda Y. Zoghbi (2013)
 Lucy Shapiro (2014)
Helen Hobbs (2015)
Bonnie Bassler (2016)
JoAnne Stubbe (2017)
Jennifer Doudna (2018)
Xiaowei Zhuang (2019)
Joanne Chory (2020)
Pamela Björkman (2021)
Katalin Karikó (2022)

See also
 List of prizes, medals, and awards for women in science
 List of biology awards

References

External links
 Pearl Meister Greengard Prize Website, The Rockefeller University
 The Man Who Loves Women Who Love Science, The Huffington Post, November 3, 2011
 Three Share Nobel Prize in Medicine for Studies of the Brain, The New York Times, October 10, 2000
 Spending the Nobel Prize, The Scientist, September 29, 2006
 How Nobel Winners Spend Their Prize Money, Time Magazine, October 10, 2008
 How One Nobel Laureate Gave Another A Hand, CBS Evening News, December 6, 2009

Science awards honoring women
Biology awards
Awards established in 2004
2004 establishments in New York City
Rockefeller University